Latigent LLC was an international provider of Business Intelligence, Enterprise RSS, and Call Center Reporting and Analytics software.

History
Latigent, LLC of Chicago, IL, was founded in 2002, as a privately held and funded company, by Chris Crosby and Jason Kolb, two veterans of the contact center industry.  Both founders believed that there was a more efficient way of using the information typically gathered in the contact center to better serve the customer and more profitably serve the enterprise.  As a result, the Latigent BlueVue performance management product was born and introduced to the market in 2003.

In December 2005, Latigent released BlueVue II, a Business Information (BI) suite.  Besides reporting functionality and complete data warehousing capabilities, BlueVue II also offered data integration capabilities for performance management.

On September 27, 2007 Cisco Systems announced a definitive agreement to acquire Latigent LLC.

References

External links
http://chrisjcrosby.com/we-are-now-a-part-of-cisco/ - Founder's Commentary on acquisition
 Founder's Commentary on acquisition

Business intelligence companies
Cisco Systems acquisitions
Software companies based in Illinois
Software companies of the United States